

Closed lines

Converted lines

Closed stations and platforms
The following railway stations in Sydney have been closed:

See also

List of Sydney railway stations

References

Notes

Citations

External links
More info on each of these stations can be viewed at the following Links
 NSW Rail Trivia Closed Sydney Stations
 NSW Rail Main Western Line

 
Sydney, closed
Railway stations, closed